Bishop Oleksandr Yazlovetskiy or Yazlovetskyi (pol. Aleksander Jazłowiecki born 2 March 1979) is a Ukrainian Roman Catholic prelate who serves as an Auxiliary bishop of the Kyiv–Zhytomyr and the Titular Bishop of Tulana since 18 September 2019.

Life
Bishop Yazlovetskiy was born in the Polish Roman Catholic family in the Sharhorod Raion of the Vinnytsia Oblast. After graduation of the school education in his native village and professional-technical college, he joined the Major Theological Seminary in Horodok in 1996; and was ordained as priest on 26 June 2004, for the Roman Catholic Diocese of Kamyanets-Podilskyi, after completed his philosophical and theological study. After the two years of pastoral and formative works, he continued studies at the Pontifical Lateran University in Rome, Italy, with Doctor of Canon Law degree in 2012.

Fr. Yazlovetskiy returned to Ukraine in 2013 and began to work in the educational camp and during 2014–2018 served as a Rector of the Major Theological Roman Catholic Seminary in Horodok. From 2018 he has been a Chancellor of the Roman Catholic Diocese of Kyiv-Zhytomyr.

On 18 September 2019 he was appointed by the Pope Francis as the Auxiliary Bishop of the Kyiv–Zhytomyr. On 9 November 2019 he was consecrated as bishop in the Co-Cathedral of St. Alexander in Kyiv.

Notes

References

External links

1979 births
Living people
Ukrainian people of Polish descent
People from Vinnytsia Oblast
Pontifical Lateran University alumni
21st-century Roman Catholic bishops in Ukraine
Roman Catholic bishops of Kyiv
Bishops appointed by Pope Francis